Per Kristian Dahl (born 18 November 1960) is a Norwegian politician for the Labour Party. He served as a deputy representative to the Norwegian Parliament from Østfold during the term 2005–2009. Locally, Dahl is the mayor of Halden municipality since 2003.

References

1960 births
Living people
Deputy members of the Storting
Labour Party (Norway) politicians
Mayors of places in Østfold
Place of birth missing (living people)
People from Halden
21st-century Norwegian politicians